Stella Chesang (born 1 December 1996) is a Ugandan long-distance runner. She won the gold medal in the 10,000 metres at the 2018 Commonwealth Games.

Chesang earned bronze for the 5000 metres at the 2015 African Under-20 Championships. She represented Uganda at the 2016 Rio Olympics. She is the Ugandan record holder for the 10,000 m and half marathon.

Background and education
Chesang was born on 1 December 1996 in Serere Village, Benet sub-county, Kween District, Uganda to Juliet Cheptoris and Patrick Kusuro. She is the second born in a family of nine siblings. She attended Benet Primary School before she transferred to Chemwania High School in Kween for her O-Level studies. Later, she graduated from Kyambogo University, with a degree in sports science.

Police career
During her primary school days, Chesang won all athletic races that she competed in. She was awarded a full academic scholarship during her four-year O-Level studies at Chemwania High School. While in Senior 3, manager of Kapchorwa Athletics Association requested Stella's parents that she goes and lives in his camp, so that she could train with other talented athletes on a regular scheduled basis. It was here that the Uganda Police Force Athletic Club found and recruited her as a police officer and member of the Uganda Police Athletic Club.

Following her winning the gold medal in the 10,000 metres at the 2018 Commonwealth Games, Chesang was promoted from the rank of Special Police Constable (SPC) to the rank of Inspector of Police (IP).

Athletic career
She won the World Mountain Running Championships in 2015 and the Ugandan Cross Country Championships in 2016.

International competitions

References

External links

1996 births
Living people
People from Kween District
Ugandan female long-distance runners
Olympic athletes of Uganda
Athletes (track and field) at the 2016 Summer Olympics
Commonwealth Games gold medallists for Uganda
Commonwealth Games medallists in athletics
Athletes (track and field) at the 2018 Commonwealth Games
Kyambogo University alumni
People from Eastern Region, Uganda
Ugandan mountain runners
Athletes (track and field) at the 2019 African Games
World Mountain Running Championships winners
Commonwealth Games gold medallists in athletics
African Games competitors for Uganda
20th-century Ugandan women
21st-century Ugandan women
Athletes (track and field) at the 2022 Commonwealth Games
Medallists at the 2018 Commonwealth Games